The grey-capped tyrannulet (Phyllomyias griseocapilla) is a species of bird in the family Tyrannidae. It is endemic to Brazil.

Its natural habitats are subtropical or tropical moist lowland forest and subtropical or tropical moist montane forest. It is threatened by habitat loss.

Gallery

References

grey-capped tyrannulet
Birds of the Atlantic Forest
Endemic birds of Brazil
grey-capped tyrannulet
grey-capped tyrannulet
Taxonomy articles created by Polbot